Thomas Prestwood (c. 1570 – 1655) was an English politician who sat in the House of Commons from 1628 to 1629.

Prestwood was the son of George Prestwood of Whetcombe, Devon. He matriculated at Broadgates Hall, Oxford on 18 March 1608, aged 15 and was awarded BA on 6 November 1610. He was a student of Middle Temple in 1611. In 1628, he was elected member of parliament for Totnes and sat until 1629 when King Charles decided to rule without parliament for eleven years.

References

1570s births
1655 deaths
English MPs 1628–1629
Alumni of Broadgates Hall, Oxford
Members of the Middle Temple
Members of the Parliament of England (pre-1707) for Totnes